Todd Pletcher (born June 26, 1967 in Dallas, Texas) is an American thoroughbred horse trainer.  He won the Eclipse Award eight times as Trainer of the Year, four of these in consecutive years. His horses Super Saver (2010) and Always Dreaming (2017) won the Kentucky Derby. He also won the Belmont Stakes with Rags to Riches (2007), Palace Malice (2013) and Tapwrit (2017). He also trained Malathaat who won the 2021 Kentucky Oaks.

Career
Pletcher began working for his father, Jake, as a hot walker at the age of seven. During his summers off from junior and senior high school, he went to California, where he worked as a hot walker for Henry Moreno at Hollywood Park and Del Mar Racetracks.

He graduated from James Madison High School in San Antonio, Texas in 1985 and began college at the University of Arizona in their Race Track Industry Program in the fall of that year. Between his sophomore and junior years, he worked as a groom for D. Wayne Lukas at Arlington Park near Chicago. He spent the following summer with another legendary Hall of Fame trainer, Charlie Whittingham, working as a groom at Hollywood Park. While attending the University of Arizona, Pletcher was an active member of Pi Kappa Alpha fraternity.

He graduated from college with a Bachelor of Animal Science in May 1989 and traveled to New York immediately following graduation to work for Lukas as a foreman in the active stable. In 1991, he was promoted to assistant trainer for Lukas, splitting his time between New York and Florida. Pletcher was Lukas's East Coast Assistant until fall of 1995 where he helped develop horses such as Thunder Gulch, Harlan, Serena's Song, A Wild Ride, and Flanders. He took out his trainer's license in December 1995 and saddled his first winner, Majestic Number, in February 1996 at Gulfstream Park in Florida.

In 2004, he got his big break and trained three-year-old filly Ashado to a win in the Kentucky Oaks at Churchill Downs in Louisville.  Later that year, Ashado won the Breeders' Cup Distaff. The filly went on to capture the Eclipse Awards for Outstanding Three-Year-Old of the year in 2004 and Best Older Female in 2005. Her stablemate, Speightstown, gave Pletcher a second Breeders' Cup win in 2004 in the Sprint division as well as a second Eclipse award when he was named Outstanding Sprint Horse that same year.

In 2005, Pletcher set a single season earnings record with purse earnings totaling $20,867,842 with trips to the winner's circle in ten Grade 1 races, including the Travers Stakes at Saratoga with Flower Alley and the Blue Grass Stakes at Keeneland Race Course with Bandini.

Pletcher broke his own single-season earnings record on October 7, 2006, when Fleet Indian captured the Beldame Stakes at Belmont Park. That win proved to be the first in a day of multiple winners for Pletcher as Honey Ryder won the Flower Bowl Invitational Stakes, English Channel won the Joe Hirsch Turf Classic Invitational Stakes, and India won the Fitz Dixon Cotillion Breeders' Cup Handicap at Philadelphia Park. His purse earnings total $27,670,243.  Later that year, he broke the 19-year-old North American record for most stakes wins in a year, on October 14, when the two-year-old colt Scat Daddy won the $400,000 Champagne Stakes at Belmont Park, making it the 93rd stakes victory of the year for Pletcher.  The record was set by his former boss and mentor, D. Wayne Lukas, in 1987.  Pletcher's 93 stakes wins included 52 graded events and a career-best 17 Grade 1 wins.

Pletcher's season included a win with Bluegrass Cat in the $1,000,000 Haskell Invitational at Monmouth Park following the colt's second-place finishes in the Kentucky Derby and Belmont Stakes.

In the 2007 Belmont Stakes, Pletcher earned his first win in a Triple Crown race when Rags to Riches became the first filly to win that race since 1905.

After missing the winner's circle with 24 previous entries, Pletcher won his first Kentucky Derby on May 1, 2010 with Super Saver, the 8-1 second choice, with jockey Calvin Borel aboard.

In 2013, Pletcher's Palace Malice, ridden by Mike Smith, won the 2013 Belmont Stakes.

In May 2014, the 140th Kentucky Derby featured four of his horses: Danza, Intense Holiday, Vinceremos and We Miss Artie. In May 2015, the 141th Kentucky Derby featured three more of his horses: Materiality, Itsaknockout, and Carpe Diem. They each finished 6th, 9th, and 10th, respectively.

In 2017, he won the Kentucky Derby a second time with Always Dreaming who was looked after for and taken care by Chris Murphy of Long Island (Nephew to the Eclipse Award winner of 1986, Declan Murphy).

Honors
Pletcher has amassed numerous training titles in New York, Kentucky and Florida, including five consecutive titles at the Saratoga summer meet.  He has received several Fourstardave (for Special Achievement at Saratoga Race Course) and Woody Stephens (for outstanding trainer) Awards from the New York Turf Writers Association. He is also a recipient of multiple Eclipse Awards.

In 2021, Todd Pletcher was voted into the United States Racing Hall of Fame.

Personal life
Pletcher and his wife, Tracy, live in Garden City, Long Island, New York. They have three children, Payton, Kyle, and Hannah.

Triple Crown Race Record 

† - Filly

‡ - Dead Heat

References

External links
Official site
National Thoroughbred Racing Association biography
Sports Illustrated profile, Apr. 24, 2007

1967 births
American horse trainers
Living people
Sportspeople from Dallas
Eclipse Award winners
United States Thoroughbred Racing Hall of Fame inductees
University of Arizona alumni